Andrey Demyanenko (born 13 April 1984) is a Belarusian rower. He competed in the men's coxless four event at the 2008 Summer Olympics.

References

1984 births
Living people
Belarusian male rowers
Olympic rowers of Belarus
Rowers at the 2008 Summer Olympics
Sportspeople from Gomel